The Lebanese Civil Aviation Authority (LCAA) is the civil aviation authority of Lebanon. It is a directorate associated to the Ministry of Public Works and Transport (MPWT), which is governed by the Regulatory Decree number 1610 dated on the 26th of July 1971.

See also

Ethiopian Airlines Flight 409

References

External links
 Lebanese Civil Aviation Authority

Lebanese governmental organisations
Lebanon
Aviation organisations based in Lebanon
Organizations investigating aviation accidents and incidents
Civil aviation in Lebanon